SS Sea Star may refer to one of two Type C3 ships built for the United States Maritime Commission:

  (MC hull no. 52, Type C3), built by Moore Dry Dock; acquired by the United States Navy and converted to troop transport USS Elizabeth C. Stanton (AP-69); sold for commercial use in 1946; scrapped in 1967
  (MC hull no. 429, Type C3-S-A2), built by Ingalls Shipbuilding; sold for commercial use in 1946; scrapped in 1973

Ship names